Saint-Bauld is a former commune in the Indre-et-Loire department in central France. On 1 January 2018, it was merged into the new commune of Tauxigny-Saint-Bauld.

Population

See also
Communes of the Indre-et-Loire department

References

Former communes of Indre-et-Loire